Reflections (also known as Deja Vu) is a 1987 Yugoslav psychological horror/drama film directed by Goran Marković and starring Mustafa Nadarević, Anica Dobra, Milorad Mandić and Petar Božović.

The film was selected as the Yugoslav entry for the Best Foreign Language Film at the 60th Academy Awards, but was not accepted as a nominee.

Plot
A mentally disturbed middle-aged musician falls in love with an attractive young girl.

Mihailo, once a brilliant young pianist, is now a piano teacher at an educational center. His colleagues consider him an oddball, but they leave him alone to live his lonely life. Everything changes when a young girl appears at his school. Contact with her, a new, erotically intense life, causes a strange phenomenon in him - as he has seen it all once before. Namely, the situations he experiences seem repeated to him. His trauma, the piano, causes painful emotions and pathological fear, a fusion of past and present, pushing him into tragedy.

Legacy
The film was listed as one of the BFI's top 100 European horror films.

See also
 List of submissions to the 60th Academy Awards for Best Foreign Language Film
 List of Yugoslav submissions for the Academy Award for Best Foreign Language Film

References

External links 
Deja Vu Trailer 
 

1987 films
1987 horror films
1980s psychological thriller films
Avala Film films
Serbian horror films
Serbian drama films
Yugoslav drama films
Films directed by Goran Marković
1980s psychological horror films
1980s Serbian-language films
Esperanto-language films
Films set in Serbia
Films set in Yugoslavia
1987 multilingual films
Yugoslav multilingual films
Serbian multilingual films